Ruxandra Popa (born 1987 in Ploiești) is a Romanian model and beauty queen. She was named Miss Romania-Earth 2008. She was crowned by Alina Gheorge, Miss Romania Earth 2007.

Miss Earth 2008
By winning Miss Romania-Earth, Popa earned the right to represent Romania at Miss Earth 2008. Ruxandra eventually became one of the favorites to win the Miss Earth 2008 crown.

In the final competition of the eighth edition of the international beauty pageant Miss Earth, Popa was announced as one of sixteen semi-finalists who moved forward to compete for the title. She ended as one of the top 16 semifinalists of Miss Earth. The Miss Earth pageant was held on November 9, 2008 at the Clark Expo Amphitheater in Angeles, Pampanga, Philippines. Eighty-five delegates arrived from October 19, 2008 in the Philippines. The pageant was broadcast live via ABS-CBN in the Philippines and to many countries worldwide via Star World, The Filipino Channel and other partner networks.

References

1987 births
Living people
People from Ploiești
Romanian female models
Miss Earth 2008 contestants
Romanian beauty pageant winners